Passione is a Brazilian telenovela that originally aired on TV Globo from May 5, 2010 to January 14, 2011. It was created and written by Sílvio de Abreu.

The plot has the actors Fernanda Montenegro, Tony Ramos, Mariana Ximenes, Reynaldo Gianecchini, Carolina Dieckmann, Rodrigo Lombardi, Marcello Antony, Larissa Maciel, Bianca Bin, Werner Schünemann, Mayana Moura and Aracy Balabanian in the leading roles.

Starring a host of TV Globo's most renowned actors, the telenovela centers on family relationships in Brazil and Italy and the secrets pertaining the characters.

Replacing Viver a Vida, it premiered on May 5, 2010 and ended its run on January 14, 2011 consisting of 209 episodes.

Cast

Brazil viewership ratings

Awards
 Seoul International Drama Awards - Best Series Drama

International Broadcasting
  – Rede Globo / May 17, 2010 – January 14, 2011
 – RTP Internacional / 2011-2012
  – SIC / 2011–2012
  – Top Channel / July, 2011 – March 30, 2012
  – RTV21
  – RTRS
  – Armenia TV
  – Ebru Africa / July 20, 2015 – present

External links
 Official website

2010 telenovelas
2010 Brazilian television series debuts
2011 Brazilian television series endings
Brazilian telenovelas
Brazilian LGBT-related television shows
TV Globo telenovelas
Portuguese-language telenovelas
Television shows set in Italy